Prismosticta tiretta is a moth in the family Endromidae first described by Charles Swinhoe in 1903. It is found in Sundaland, Vietnam, Malaysia, Thailand and Myanmar.

References

Moths described in 1903
Prismosticta